The 1994 Cork Senior Football Championship was the 106th staging of the Cork Senior Football Championship since its establishment by the Cork County Board in 1887. The draw for the opening round fixtures took place at the Cork Convention on 12 December 1993. The championship began on 1 May 1994 and ended on 9 October 1994.

Nemo Rangers entered the championship as the defending champions, however, they were defeated by Castlehaven at the semi-final stage.

On 9 October 1994, Castlehaven won the championship following a 0-12 to 0-10 defeat of O'Donovan Rossa in a final replay. This was their second championship title overall and their first title since 1989.

O'Donovan Rossa's Mick McCarthy was the championship's top scorer with 0-29.

Team changes

To Championship

Promoted from the Cork Intermediate Football Championship
 Bantry Blues

Results

First round

Second round

Quarter-finals

Semi-finals

Finals

Championship statistics

Top scorers

Top scorers overall

Top scorers in a single game

References

Cork Senior Football Championship